The 2009 Mauritian Cup final took place on 17 May 2009 at the Sir Gaëtan Duval Stadium in Mauritius. The match was contested by Etoile de l'Ouest and Pamplemousses SC. Pamplemousses SC won the final 6-1 with a hat-trick from Hubert Robson.

Match

References

Mauritian Cup
Cup